The 1974–75 Phoenix Suns season was the seventh season for the Phoenix Suns of the National Basketball Association. The Suns' roster averaged 2.8 years of professional experience, and included four one-year players in addition to three rookies. Coming off a 30–52 season, the Suns only improved by two games, finishing 32–50 under second-year head coach John MacLeod. All home games were played at Arizona Veterans Memorial Coliseum.

Coming off an All-Star season, guard/forward Charlie Scott led the Suns in both points and assists with averages of 24.3 and 4.5 a game. For Scott, it was the third and final NBA All-Star Game selection of his career. 31-year-old Dick Van Arsdale, the only player remaining from the Suns' inaugural season roster, was second in scoring with a 16.1 average. Fourth-year forward Curtis Perry enjoyed his first season with Phoenix, posting career-highs in both points and rebounds, averaging 13.4 points and a team-high 11.9 rebounds per game.

Offseason

NBA Draft

Roster
{| class="toccolours" style="font-size: 85%; width: 100%;"
|-
! colspan="2" style="background-color: #423189;  color: #FF8800; text-align: center;" | Phoenix Suns roster
|- style="background-color: #FF8800; color: #423189;   text-align: center;"
! Players !! Coaches
|-
| valign="top" |

References
 Standings on Basketball Reference

Phoenix
Phoenix Suns seasons